Orly Sade (born 1969) is a financial economist based out of the Hebrew University of Jerusalem who has been noted for her research regarding behavioral and experimental finance and crowdfunding platforms. Sade is the Israel Associate Professor of Finance at the Department of Finance, School of Business Administration at the Hebrew University of Jerusalem. She is the first female professor in the field of finance at Hebrew University.

Education and academic career 
Sade obtained a Bachelor of Arts in Business Administration and Economics as well as an MBA in Business Administration at the Tel Aviv University, Israel. In 2001 she completed her Ph.D. in Finance at the David Eccles School of Business at the University of Utah.

Since 2013 Sade has been an Associate Professor of Finance at the Department of Finance, School of Business Administration, Hebrew University of Jerusalem, where she served as director of the BA program. She is the first woman in Israel to become an Associate Professor with tenure in the field of Finance.

Sade is a Visiting Associate Professor in the finance department at the Stern School of Business, NYU. In the past, she worked as a visiting Associate Professor in different universities such as IE in Madrid, EIEF in Rome, NES in Moscow and at NYU Shanghai. Sade is an experimental economist based at the Hebrew University of Jerusalem, Israel. Sade has been noted for her research with Dan Marom regarding crowdfunding platforms. She is the first female professor in the field of finance at Hebrew University.

Other Work 
Besides her academic work, Sade, advises financial institutions and companies in the fields of finance, debt offerings, and tenders. Since 2017  Sade is a Director at "Clal Insurance company".

In the past, Sade worked in the Banking Supervision Department of the Bank of Israel and was a member of the advisory board of the Israeli Ministry of Finance as well as the board of directors of the Israeli Securities Authority. Sade also served as a member of the investment committee for the “Hadassah” pension fund and the Investment Committee of the Hebrew University Workers Fund. Sade was a member of the board of directors of the Hebrew University provident fund and an outside director at Sigma Mutual Funds.

Research 
Sade's main fields of research are behavioral and experimental finance, financial auctions and market microstructures, the design of financial markets as well as crowdfunding. Sade's research is published in scientific Journals and presented at conferences worldwide. Sade received academic grants and awards including multiple grants from the Israel Science Foundation as well as the Abe Gray awards from the President of the Hebrew University. Sade has conducted research into pensions and found that people with less financial knowledge are less likely to take advantage of their available options. She's also found that people with good finances check their financial options more often than those with poor finances, who tends to "bury their heads in the sand."

Main Publications 

 Haran Rosen, M., & Sade, O. (2022) The Disparate Effect of Nudges on Minority Groups. The Review of Corporate Financial Studies (RCFS).
 Haran Rosen, M., & Sade, O. (2022) Investigating the Introduction of Fintech Advancement Aimed to Reduce Limited Attention Regarding Inactive Savings Accounts – Data, Survey and Field Experiment.  forthcoming AEA Papers and Proceedings.
 Hurwitz, A., Mitchell, O. & Sade, O. (2021) Longevity Perceptions and Saving Decisions during the Covid-19 Outbreak: An Experimental Investigation. AEA Papers and Proceedings. 111, pages 297-301
 Gafni, H., Marom, D., Robb, A. & Sade, O. (2020) Gender Dynamics in Crowdfunding: (Kickstarter): Evidence on Entrepreneurs, Backers, and Taste-Based Discrimination. The Review of Finance.
Mugerman, Y., Wnter, E. & Sade, O. (2020), Out-Of-Pocket vs. Out-Of-Investment in Financial Advisory Fees: Evidence from the Lab. Journal of Economic Psychology.
Hurwitz, A., Sade, O. & Winter, E. (2020) Can Mandatory Minimum Annuity Laws Have Unintended Consequences? An Experimental Study. Journal of Economic Behavior & Organization, Volume 169, pp. 208–222.
 Hurwitz, A. & Sade, O. (2020) An Investigation of Time Preferences, Life Expectancy and Annuity versus Lump-Sum Choices – Can Smoking Harm Long-Term Saving Decisions? Journal of Economic Behavior & Organization, volume 180, pages 812-825.
Gafni, Marom & Sade. (2018) Are the Life and Death of an Early Stage Venture Indeed in the Power of the Tongue? Lessons from Online Crowdfunding Pitches. Strategic Entrepreneurship Journal (SEJ), 2018, pp. 1-21.
Mugerman, Sade, & Shayo. (2014). Long term saving decisions: financial reform, peer effects and ethnicity. Journal of Economic Behavior & Organization, 106, 235-253
 Camargo, Schnitzlein, Zender, & Sade. (2012). Divisible good auctions with asymmetric information: an experimental examination. Journal of financial and quantitative analysis, 48(4), 1271-1300
 Camargo, Schnitzlein, Zender, & Sade. (2013). On the persistence of overconfidence: evidence from multi- unit auctions. journal of behavioral finance.
 Brenner, Galai & Sade. (2009). Sovereign debt auctions: uniform or discriminatory? Journal of monetary economics, 56(2), 267-274.
 Galili & Sade. (2006). "The ostrich effect" and the relationship between the liquidity and the yields of financial assets. The journal of business, 79(5).
 Schnitzlein, Zender & Sade. (2006). When less (potential demand) is more (revenue): asymmetric bidding capacities in feasible good auctions. The review of finance (ROF), 10(3), 389-416.
 Schnitzlein, Zender & Sade. (2006). Competition and cooperation in feasible good auctions: an experimental examination. The review of financial studies (RFS), 19(1), 195-235.
 Kalay, Wohl & Sade. (2004). measuring stock illiquidity: an investigation of the demand and supply schedule at the TASE. The journal of financial economics, 74(3), 461-486.
 Crowley & Sade. (2004). Does the option to cancel an order in a double auction market matter? The economics letters, 83(1), 89-97.
 Brenner, Galili & Sade. (2010). A Note on Sovereign Debt Auctions: Uniform or discriminatory? In R. W. Kolb, J. Wiley & Sons, Inc., Sovereign Debt: From Safety to Default (119-127). New Jersey: John Wiley & Sons, Inc.
Brenner, M., Galai, D. & Sade, O. (2016) Uniform or Discriminatory Auctions: Endogenizing Bidder’s Choice in Divisible Good Auctions In Behavioral Finance: Where do Investors Biases Come From"? edited by Itzhak Venezia.
Zur, E. & Sade, O. (2011). Baseball and the art of fair value: Do managers or the prediction markets make better predictions? In I. Venezia & Z. Wiener., Bridging the GAAP: Recent advanced in finance and accounting (63-93). Singapore: World Scientific Publishing Co. Pte. Ltd.

Books 
Sade co-authored a children's book that teaches young people some of the basics of economics:

•    Sade, O. & Neurborne, E. (2011). How Ella Grew An Electric Guitar. New York: CreateSpace Independent Publishing Platform (110 Pages)

References

External links 
 Official Website
 Orly Sade's CV 2018 at her website
 Personal Profile at the HUJI website
 Personal Profile at the NYC website
 Sade's page at the website of The Embassy of Israel to the U.S
 Sade's Page at the ISA website

Academic staff of the Hebrew University of Jerusalem
University of Utah alumni
1969 births
Living people
Tel Aviv University alumni
Israeli women academics
21st-century Israeli economists
20th-century Israeli  economists
Experimental economists
Israeli women economists